Digital Chameleon was a comic book coloring and inking studio based in Winnipeg, Manitoba, Canada. They have countless credits for a variety of publishers, and are attributed with being the first studio to make the use of the computer software program Adobe Photoshop widespread in the comics' industry. In addition to their work in the comics field, Digital Chameleon also colored animation, CD covers, posters, magazines, and advertisements.

Digital Chameleon closed its doors in 2003.

History 
The company was formed in 1991, by Christopher Chuckry (president), and Lovern Kindzierski (vice-president, creative director), with partners Ed Beddome, Tim Riddoch and Dick Thomas. Colorists at Digital Chameleon included Kindzierski, Laurie E. Smith, George Freeman, Bernie Mireault, and Carla Feeney. Partner Beddome left the company in 1993, and co-founder Chuckry left the company in 1996. After Chuckry's departure, Kindzierski acted as president and Freeman as art director. After Freeman left, Igor Kordey was the studio's art director.

Awards 
Digital Chameleon was recognized for its work with nominations for the Comics Buyer's Guide Favorite Colorist Award in 1997 and 1998 (both with Kindzierski), and again in 1999, 2000, 2001, and 2003.

References

External links 
 

1991 establishments in Manitoba
Comics industry
Comics studios
Design companies disestablished in 2003
Design companies established in 1991
2003 disestablishments in Manitoba
Defunct companies based in Winnipeg